Bolshoye Sokurovo is a rural locality (a village) in Denisovskoye Rural Settlement, Gorokhovetsky District, Vladimir Oblast, Russia. The population was 34 as of 2010.

Geography 
Bolshoye Sokurovo is located on the Trema River, 35 km west of Gorokhovets (the district's administrative centre) by road. Maloye Sokurovo is the nearest rural locality.

References 

Rural localities in Gorokhovetsky District